Philip Arden Beachy (born October 25, 1958) is Ernest and Amelia Gallo Professor at Stanford University School of Medicine in Palo Alto, California and an Associate at Stanford's Institute of Stem Cell Biology and Regenerative Medicine.

Early life 
Beachy was born in Red Lake, Ontario, on October 25, 1958. Beachy spent eight of his early years of life in the hills of central Puerto Rico. His father was a pastor of a rural church. He attended a school taught in Spanish during the day and then learned to read and write English once he came home from school. At nine, Beachy and his family returned to their home base of Goshen, Indiana where he began attending public school. At the early age of 16, Beachy headed off to Goshen College which was very close to home. At this time, Beachy still did not know of his love for science. “Unlike many people who knew they were going to be scientists from a very early age, I didn't decide that I would try to become a scientist until fairly late on in college,” he says.

Education
Beachy received his bachelor's degree in natural sciences at Goshen College. Beachy first envisioned himself as a doctor, but after his first year of college, he decided against pursuing that career. He then decided to focus on biological research. He became interested in this field after reading a serialized form of Horace Freeland Judson's book, The Eighth Day of Creation in The New Yorker. "Reading those articles got me excited about molecular biology," says Beachy. After graduating, he decided to take chemistry courses and do more research at the nearby South Bend campus of Indiana University. A year later, he decided to attend graduate school at Stanford University. There, he studied the molecular genetics behind fruit fly development with David Hogness. Beachy earned his Ph.D in biochemistry in 1986 at Stanford for research into the UBX protein domain.

Career 

After receiving his Ph.D, he began working at the Carnegie Institution's Department of Embryology in Baltimore for two years. After his short time there, he accepted a faculty position at the Johns Hopkins University School of Medicine. Beachy began focusing on the Drosophila hedgehog gene, for which he's known for, in 1990. The gene's name originated because fly embryos look spikey if the hedgehog gene is faulty or mutated. The hedgehog gene's main function is to create protein signals in specific cells. These signals, in turn, allow for the formation of embryonic tissues. They do this by instructing neighboring cells to become a certain type of differentiated cell or to simply divide. In other words, this gene is responsible for the development of the appendages and body segments in Drosophila or fruit flies. Humans and other invertebrates have hedgehog genes that behave slightly different than the same gene in the fruit fly. In vertebrates, the hedgehog gene codes for the fingers and toes on the limbs. It also functions in organizing the brain and the spinal cord. Consequently, mutated hedgehog genes often cause birth defects. Also, if it is activated later in life, certain cancers can be triggered and begin to spread.

In 2006, Beachy moved from Johns Hopkins to Stanford University's Department of Developmental Biology and its Institute for Stem Cell Biology and Regenerative Medicine. He is interested in the function of Hedgehog proteins and other extracellular signals in morphogenesis (pattern formation) and in injury repair and regeneration (pattern maintenance), in particular the normal roles of such signals in stem cell physiology and their abnormal roles in the formation and expansion of cancer stem cells. He is also interested in how the distribution of such signals is regulated in tissues, how cells perceive and respond to distinct concentrations of signals, and how such signaling pathways arose in evolution.

Research
Beachy's research focuses on understanding the molecular mechanisms behind the growth of multicellular embryos, especially the role of the Hedgehog signaling pathway.

Awards and honors
Beachy has received numerous awards and prizes for his work, including the Outstanding Young Scientist Award from the Maryland Academy of Sciences in 1997 and the National Academy of Sciences Award in Molecular Biology in 1998.  In 2008, Beachy received the March of Dimes Prize in Developmental Biology jointly with Cliff Tabin. In 2011, Beachy received the Keio Medical Science Prize.

Beachy was elected a member of the United States National Academy of Sciences in 2002, and a Fellow of the American Academy of Arts and Sciences (2003).

Personal life
Beachy is the brother of the historian, Robert M. Beachy, and a cousin of biologist Roger N. Beachy and author Stephen Beachy.

References

External links
 Philip A. Beachy Profile at Stanford University

1958 births
Living people
Members of the United States National Academy of Sciences
American biochemists
Stanford University School of Medicine alumni
Howard Hughes Medical Investigators
Goshen College alumni
Fellows of the American Academy of Arts and Sciences
Stanford University School of Medicine faculty
Articles containing video clips